Joseph-Marie Savignac was a Canadian politician and a City Councillor in Montreal, Quebec.

City Councillor

He ran for a seat on Montreal's City Council in the district of Saint-Denis in 1926 and 1928, but lost against Joseph Alonzo Savard.  He defeated Savard in 1930, but Savard won the seat back in 1932.  Savignac won again in 1934.  He was re-elected in 1936 and 1938, 1940, 1942, 1944, 1947, 1950, 1954 and 1957.  He did not run for re-election in 1960.

Chairman of the Executive Council

He served as Chairman of Montreal's Executive Committee during Camillien Houde's tenure as Mayor from 1934 to 1936 and from 1936 to 1938, as well as during Sarto Fournier's term from 1957 to 1960.

Footnotes

Montreal city councillors